IEEE Transactions on Medical Imaging is a monthly peer-reviewed scientific journal published by the Institute of Electrical and Electronics Engineers (IEEE). It covers technological aspects of medical imaging techniques. The journal was established in 1982 and since 2019 the editor-in-chief is Leslie Ying (University at Buffalo). It is sponsored by four IEEE societies, IEEE Engineering in Medicine and Biology Society, IEEE Signal Processing Society, IEEE Nuclear and Plasma Sciences Society, and IEEE Ultrasonics, Ferroelectrics & Frequency Control Society.

Abstracting and indexing 
The journal is abstracted and indexed in:
 MEDLINE 
 PubMed  
 Science Citation Index Expanded  
 Scopus  

According to the Journal Citation Reports, the journal has a 2020 impact factor of 10.048, ranking it 5th out of 111 journals in the category "Computer Science, Interdisciplinary Applications" and 4th out of 133 journals in the category "Radiology, Nuclear Medicine & Medical Imaging".

References

External links

Medical physics journals
IEEE academic journals
Publications established in 1982
Monthly journals
English-language journals